Paksha  (also known as pakṣa; , Nepal Bhasa: thwa and gа̄) refers to a fortnight or a lunar phase in a month of the Hindu lunar calendar.

Literally meaning "side", a paksha is the period either side of the Full Moon Day (Purnima). A lunar month in the Hindu calendar has two fortnights, and begins with the New moon, (Amavasya). The lunar days are called tithis and each month has 30 tithis, which may vary from 20 – 27 hours. A paksha has 15 tithis, which are calculated by a 12 degree motion of the Moon. The first fortnight between New Moon Day and Full Moon Day is called "Gaura Paksha" or Shukla Paksha the period of the brightening moon (waxing moon), and the second fortnight of the month is called "Vadhya Paksha" or Krishna Paksha, the period of the fading moon (waning moon). Neemuch Panchang begin new lunar month from first day of Krishna Paksha while Gujarat Panchang begin new lunar month from first day of Shukla Paksha.

Days of Shukla Paksha and Krishna Paksha

Shukla Paksha
Shukla paksha, thwa (𑐠𑑂𑐰𑑅, थ्वः) in Nepal Bhasa, refers to the bright lunar fortnight or waxing moon in the Hindu calendar. Shukla is Sanskrit word for "white" or "bright".

Shukla Paksha (Waxing Moon period) is a period of 15 days, which begins after Amavasya (New Moon) day and culminating Purnima (Full Moon) day and is considered auspicious because it is favorable to growth or expansion on every plane of existence i.e. Mental, Physical and Spiritual Plane.

Numerous festivals are held during this period, including the Navratri festivals, most importantly Chaitra Navratri and Ashvin Navratri.

Krishna Paksha
Krishna paksha, gа̄ (𑐐𑐵𑑅, गाः) in Nepal Bhasa, refers to the dark lunar fortnight or waning moon in the Hindu calendar. Krishna is Sanskrit word for "dark". 
Krishna Paksha is a period of 15 days, which begins after Purnima day (Full Moon), culminating on (New Moon) day (Amavasya). Krishna Paksha is considered inauspicious, as the moon loses light during this period.

Festivals during Krishna Paksha are:

Other usages
In Vedic astrology when a person does a prasna (a question chart) and the planet Venus indicates the time period, the event referred to in the answer will happen in a pakṣa (fortnight) from the time the question was asked.

See also
 Pitru Paksha

References

 K. V. Sarma (2008), "Paksa", Encyclopaedia of the History of Science, Technology, and Medicine in Non-Western Cultures (2nd edition) edited by Helaine Selin, Springer, .

External links
 Ahargana - The Astronomy of the Hindu Calendar: Maana, Krishna Pksha, Shukla Paksha and Chandra Masa Explains Krishna paksha and Shukla paksha by means of astronomical simulations created using Stellarium.
 Hindu Festivals Calendar 2010 
 Introduction to the Hindu Calendar (pdf)

Hindu calendar
Phases of the Moon